The 2015 NBA draft was held on June 25, 2015, at Barclays Center in Brooklyn. It was televised nationally in the U.S. by ESPN. National Basketball Association (NBA) teams took turns selecting amateur U.S. college basketball players and other eligible players, including international players. The draft lottery took place on May 19, 2015.

The Minnesota Timberwolves won the draft lottery to earn the first overall pick in the draft. It marked the first time in Timberwolves history that they would receive the first overall pick through the lottery. The player selected would also be the third consecutive number one pick on the Timberwolves roster, joining Andrew Wiggins (2014) and Anthony Bennett (2013) - who were traded to Minnesota for forward Kevin Love. This draft also gave the Los Angeles Lakers the second overall pick after jumping over the Philadelphia 76ers and the New York Knicks within the draft lottery.

Highlights from the draft include the first Dominican to be the first overall pick (Karl-Anthony Towns), the highest number of Kentucky Wildcats selected in the draft lottery (four with Karl-Anthony Towns, Willie Cauley-Stein, Trey Lyles, and Devin Booker), which tied the North Carolina Tar Heels in 2005 for most players selected in the lottery by one school; the tied record for most Kentucky players selected in the draft (six with Towns, Cauley-Stein, Lyles, Booker, Andrew Harrison, and Dakari Johnson), the second Latvian to have been drafted in the first round (Kristaps Porziņģis), the first former high school player to have skipped college to play in China that was selected in the draft (Emmanuel Mudiay), and the first Indian-born player to have been selected in the NBA (Satnam Singh), who was also the first player since 2005 to have been drafted directly from high school (albeit as a postgraduate).

Other noteworthy announcements that came out of the draft included the official announcement of the passing of the last pioneer of the original NBA, Harvey Pollack, around the third pick and the resignation of the league's president of basketball operations Rod Thorn that became official in August after the end of the first round.

Draft selections

Notable undrafted players

These players were not selected in the 2015 NBA draft, but have appeared in at least one regular-season or playoff game in the NBA.

Eligibility and entrants

The draft was conducted under the eligibility rules established in the league's new 2011 collective bargaining agreement (CBA) with its players union. The CBA that ended the 2011 lockout instituted no immediate changes to the draft, but called for a committee of owners and players to discuss future changes. Since the 2011 CBA, the basic eligibility rules have been:
 All drafted players must be at least 19 years old during the calendar year of the draft. In terms of dates, players eligible for the 2015 draft must be born on or before December 31, 1996.
 Any player who is not an "international player", as defined in the CBA, must be at least one year removed from the graduation of his high school class. The CBA defines "international players" as players who permanently resided outside the United States for three years prior to the draft, did not complete high school in the U.S., and have never enrolled at a U.S. college or university.

Early entrants
Player who are not automatically eligible must declare their eligibility for the draft by notifying the NBA offices in writing no later than 60 days before the draft. For the 2015 draft, this date fell on April 26. After this date, "early entry" players may attend NBA pre-draft camps and individual team workouts to show off their skills and obtain feedback regarding their draft positions. Under the CBA, a player may withdraw his name from consideration from the draft at any time before the final declaration date, which is 10 days before the draft. Under NCAA rules at that time, players only had until April 16 to withdraw from the draft and maintain their college eligibility. In January 2016, the NCAA changed its draft withdrawal date to 10 days after the end of the annual NBA Draft Combine in May, with the 2016 draft the first to be held under the new rule.

A player who has hired an agent will forfeit his remaining college eligibility, regardless of whether he is drafted. Also, while the CBA allows a player to withdraw from the draft twice, the NCAA then mandated that a player who declared twice lost his college eligibility. The aforementioned 2016 NCAA rule change also allowed players to declare for more than one draft without losing college eligibility.

This year, a total of 48 collegiate players and 43 international players declared as early entry candidates before the April 26 deadline. On June 15, the withdrawal deadline, 34 early entry candidates withdrew from the draft and one early entry candidate is added, leaving 47 collegiate players and 11 international players as the early entry candidates for the draft.

Automatically eligible entrants

Players who do not meet the criteria for "international" players are automatically eligible if they meet any of the following criteria:
 They have completed 4 years of their college eligibility.
 If they graduated from high school in the U.S., but did not enroll in a U.S. college or university, four years have passed since their high school class graduated.
 They have signed a contract with a professional basketball team outside of the NBA, anywhere in the world, and have played under that contract.

Players who meet the criteria for "international" players are automatically eligible if they meet any of the following criteria:
 They are least 22 years old during the calendar year of the draft. In terms of dates, players born on or before December 31, 1993, are automatically eligible for the 2015 draft.
 They have signed a contract with a professional basketball team outside of the NBA within the United States, and have played under that contract.

Based on the eligibility rules, every college seniors who have completed their college eligibility and every "international" players who were born on or before December 31, 1993, are automatically eligible for the draft. However, there are other players who became automatically eligible even though they have not completed their four-year college eligibility.

Combine

The invitation-only NBA Draft Combine was scheduled to occur in Chicago from May 12 to 17. The on-court element of the combine was scheduled for May 14 and 15.

Draft lottery

The NBA conducted an annual draft lottery to determine the draft order for the teams that did not make the playoffs in the preceding season. Every NBA team that missed the NBA playoffs had a chance at winning a top three pick, but teams with worse records had a better chance at winning a top three pick. After the lottery selected the teams that receive a top three pick, the other teams received an NBA draft pick based on their winning percentage from the prior season. The table below shows each non-playoff team's chances (based on their record at the end of the NBA season) of receiving picks 1–14.

The 2015 NBA lottery was held on May 19. The Minnesota Timberwolves, who had the worst record in the NBA and the highest chance to win the lottery at 25%, won the lottery. The Los Angeles Lakers moved from the fourth spot to second, while the Philadelphia 76ers got the third pick. The only team that moved down from their original draft position altogether was the New York Knicks, who moved from the projected second pick to the fourth pick.

Draft ceremony
In the first round of the NBA draft, each team has up to five minutes to decide which player they would like to select. The team can also propose a trade with another team before making their selection. The NBA commissioner will announce the selection and the player, wearing a basketball cap sporting the team's logo, comes up to the stage to be congratulated and presented to the audience. In the second round, each team has up to two minutes to make their picks while the deputy commissioner assumes the commissioner's role.

The NBA annually invites around 15–20 players to sit in the "green room", a special room set aside at the draft site for the invited players plus their families and agents. When their names are called, the player leaves the room and goes up on stage. Other players who are not invited are allowed to attend the ceremony, sit in the stands with the fans and walk up on stage when (or if) they are drafted. The 19 players who accepted invitations to attend the draft were Devin Booker, Willie Cauley-Stein, Sam Dekker, Jerian Grant, Rondae Hollis-Jefferson, Stanley Johnson, Frank Kaminsky, Kevon Looney, Trey Lyles, Emmanuel Mudiay, Jahlil Okafor, Kelly Oubre Jr., Cameron Payne, Bobby Portis, Kristaps Porziņģis, D'Angelo Russell, Karl-Anthony Towns, Myles Turner, and Justise Winslow. International prospect Mario Hezonja did not attend because he was still involved with his then-team FC Barcelona at the time. Three other players, R.J. Hunter, Tyus Jones, and Delon Wright all had invitations as well, but they declined their invitations for undisclosed reasons.

Trades involving draft picks

Pre-draft trades
Prior to the day of the draft, the following trades were made and resulted in exchanges of draft picks between the teams.

Draft-day trades
The following trades involving drafted players were made on the day of the draft.

Notes

See also
 List of first overall NBA draft picks

References

External links

Official Site

Draft
National Basketball Association draft
NBA draft
NBA draft
2010s in Brooklyn
Basketball in New York City
Sporting events in New York City
Sports in Brooklyn
Events in Brooklyn, New York